is a former Japanese football player.

Career
He was discovered and signed based on his performance in the December 2007 open tryout, becoming thus far the only Mito player to be signed without having been scouted or promoted. 
During the 2013–14 winter transfer window, Hoshino joined the newly formed Latvian Higher League club FK Liepāja. He left the club in July 2014. In August 2014, he signed with FK Auda for two years.

Club statistics

References

External links

1985 births
Living people
Seisa Dohto University alumni
Association football people from Gunma Prefecture
Japanese footballers
J2 League players
Japan Football League players
Mito HollyHock players
Tochigi City FC players
FK Liepāja players
Japanese expatriate footballers
Expatriate footballers in Latvia
Japanese expatriate sportspeople in Latvia
Association football defenders